Ganzhou is a prefecture-level city in Jiangxi, China.

Ganzhou may also refer to:
Ganzhou District, a district in Zhangye, Gansu, China
Ganzhou (historical prefecture), a former prefecture centering in modern Zhangye, Gansu, China